Chaska Senior High School (CHS) is a public high school located in Chaska, Minnesota, United States, a southwestern suburb of the Minneapolis-St. Paul area. CHS is a 912 grade school that is attended by more than 1,500 students.

The school mascot is the "Hawk," with the school colors being purple and gold.

History
Chaska High School first opened in the early 20th-century with its first graduating class in 1906. Since then, Chaska High School has moved to newer facilities three times. Currently, Chaska High School resides at 545 Pioneer Trail. The present facility opened in 1996.

The high school was plagued with a series of racist incidents, starting with media coverage in September 2018 of students who attended a home football game in blackface and an African American-style wig. The issue was echoed in 2019 with another blackface incident in February.

Several black students responded by naming themselves Black History Uncensored and leading a peaceful protest on March 1, 2019 at Chaska High School. They created posters that were presented at a community center event later that month. The protest was against what they and others saw as inequitable censorship of their efforts to share what they viewed as important stories in American history.

Responding to news media coverage of an image circulating on students' social media and posted to a lacrosse channel by Chaska students, Bach and superintendent of schools Clint Christopher admitted they'd known about the images for "about a week," and apologized for not at the meeting being transparent about it with parents. The image featured the faces of 25 black students photoshopped on a map with "Negro Hill" written on it.

Current facilities
Chaska's current facilities feature auditorium, several gymnasiums, a cafeteria, tech-ed labs, computer labs, a media center, a stadium, and several athletic fields. Originally designed for 1,600 students, the school received a substantial addition in 2004.

Houses
Chaska High School is organized into four main houses:

Purple House
Blue House
Red House
Green House

Each house has two stories and similar design. They are connected by one large hallway. This main hallway is a little less than one quarter mile long. There is also a South Wing of the high school, south of the main hallway, which holds the cafeteria and connects to the activities section of the school. Starting in 2012, the Green House was converted into the Family Learning Center, a pre-school setting. As of 2017, the Green House returned to a normal high school setting, holding mostly freshmen.

Media center
The Chaska High School media center is the school's library and technology center. It has four separate labs; two of which use Dell PCs and two which use Apple computers. The first floor consists of the library proper, as well as all PCs. Second floor houses the Apple computer labs, as well as Jumpstart studios, the semi-weekly school news program. The media center area also holds the copy room, tech support and all other IT services for the school.

The South Wing
This takes up about half the school's area. It consists of the band room, choir room, cafeteria, the auditorium, two gymnasiums, the weight room, locker rooms, workshops, additional classrooms, the activities office, athletic locker rooms, and other athletic-related areas. It is connected through the blue house and the media center. The cafeteria is one story with a high cone glass roof, but the athletic area is two stories.

Activities

Music
Chaska High School has four choirs, three bands, and many extracurricular groups that offer a wide range of music styles and levels. The choirs are called Cantare, Vivace, Bel Canto, and Concert Choir; the bands are Concert Band, Symphonic Band, and Wind Symphony.

Academic teams
Chaska High School actively participates in several academic competitions, including Knowledge Bowl, Quiz Bowl, and Science Bowl.

Chaska won the Minnesota State Knowledge Bowl Meet in 1992, 1993, 1995, 1997, 2003, 2009, and 2012. It also won the Minnesota High School Quiz Bowl League in 1992, 1993, 1999, 2000, 2003, 2004, and 2009.

Sports
Chaska High School is part of the Metro West Conference in the Minnesota State High School League.

Notable alumni
Andy Bisek, Greco-Roman wrestler
Tony Denman, actor (Fargo) 
Brad Gulden, retired MLB player 
Brad Hand, Major League Baseball pitcher (Florida/Miami Marlins, San Diego Padres)
Mike Lindell, founder of My Pillow
Tim Mattran, football player (St. Louis Rams) 
Nick Mattson, University of North Dakota hockey player and Chicago Black Hawks draftee  
Erik Paulsen, United States Representative, businessman 
Sam Rinzel, hockey player and Chicago Black Hawks draftee  
 Ross Travis, tight end for Kansas City Chiefs
Scott Wolter, geologist and host of H2 television show America Unearthed

References

Sources

External links
Chaska High School website

Public high schools in Minnesota
Chaska, Minnesota
Schools in Carver County, Minnesota
Educational institutions established in 1905
1905 establishments in Minnesota